John Dickson "Boomer" Stufflebeem is a former United States Navy vice admiral who last served in that rank as the director of Navy Staff. Stufflebeem served 39 years in the Navy and is well known for his football career and television briefings from the Pentagon following the attacks of 9/11 and subsequent military operations in Afghanistan. He is the Senior Vice President and founder of the NJS Group, LLC, a company specializing in strategic communications and planning as well as crisis management.

Naval Academy and football
Stufflebeem enlisted in the Navy Reserve in 1969 beginning his service as a deck seaman before being accepted into the United States Naval Academy in 1971. Stufflebeem played on the Naval Academy football team, earning the nickname "Boomer" for his prowess as a punter. He earned All East Coast Athletic Conference and Sports Illustrated honors in 1974 when his punting kept Navy competitive in a game versus Notre Dame until the last quarter. Navy lost the game, played in Philadelphia, 14-6.

He graduated from the academy in 1975. Although undrafted by any NFL team, his first assignment to the Detroit area allowed him to participate in three pre-seasons of professional football with the Detroit Lions

Military career
Stufflebeem was designated a Surface Warfare Officer in 1978 and Naval Aviator in 1980. As a commissioned officer, Stufflebeem served operational tours in a surface combatant, various fighter squadrons and carrier air wing staffs in the Pacific and Atlantic Fleets. He commanded Fighter Squadron Eighty-Four and Carrier Air Wing One during combat operations in the Balkans and Persian Gulf and Carrier Group Two/Task Force 60 during Operation Iraqi Freedom. Stufflebeem has flown over 4,000 hours in a variety of fighter aircraft and has more than 1,000 aircraft carrier landings.

Additionally, Stufflebeem has served in staff assignments including Military Aide to President George H. W. Bush, Deputy Executive Assistant and later, Executive Assistant to the Chief of Naval Operations. His first assignment as a flag officer was Deputy Director for Global Operations (J-3) on the Joint Staff during Operation Enduring Freedom.

On May 20, 2005 at Naval Support Activity Naples, Stufflebeem was promoted to vice admiral and took command of the 6th Fleet, relieving then-Vice Admiral Harry Ulrich. He held this position until September 2007.

Pentagon spokesperson
Following the attacks on the U.S. of September 11, 2001, then Rear Admiral Stufflebeem became the face and voice from the Pentagon of U.S. military operations being conducted in Afghanistan to remove the Taliban from power and rid the country of al Qaeda.  For months he provided briefings from The Pentagon to international television and radio media on the prosecution of what was known as Operation Enduring Freedom as most reporters were not in Afghanistan during this time.

NATO
While serving as the commander of the U.S. Sixth Fleet and NATO's operational command in Lisbon, Portugal, then Vice Admiral Stufflebeem led the first deployment of NATO Response Force troops out of the European theater to Pakistan.  This was a humanitarian assistance and disaster relief mission in response to the 2005 Kashmir earthquake. Additionally, he supported the African Union Mission in Sudan, the political-military mission to address the problems occurring in Darfur.

Controversy
In December 2007, Stufflebeem assumed the duties of Director, Navy Staff, relieving then-Vice Admiral Mark P. Fitzgerald. Early in 2008, the Department of Defense began an investigation into an allegation that Stufflebeem had an inappropriate relationship while serving as a presidential military aide in 1990. The Navy announced on March 24, 2008 that Stufflebeem was removed as director of the Navy Staff. His removal was directly due to the false and misleading testimony Stufflebeem gave to investigators and in conversations with his seniors on multiple occasions. As a result, Stufflebeem reverted back to his permanent two-star rank. In April 2008, the US Navy announced that Stufflebeem had received a written reprimand as a result of non-judicial punishment following the investigation. He subsequently retired from the Navy with the rank of rear admiral.

Awards and recognitions
In 2000 at its annual awards banquet, the NCAA honored Stufflebeem as one of its Silver Anniversary Award Recipients that recognizes up to six nationally distinguished former student-athletes on their 25th anniversary as college graduates. In 2003 Bill Belichick (who was the special teams coach of the Detroit Loins in 1976) had Stufflebeem deliver a message to the New England Patriots before a game.

Military awards and decorations
Stufflebeem's military decorations include the Navy Distinguished Service Medal, Defense Superior Service Medal, Legion of Merit (four awards), Bronze Star, Meritorious Service Medal, and Air Medal (two strike/flight awards).

Foreign awards

Devices and badges

References

External links

Living people
United States Navy admirals
United States Naval Academy alumni
Recipients of the Legion of Merit
United States Naval Aviators
Detroit Lions players
Navy Midshipmen football players
Recipients of the Navy Distinguished Service Medal
Recipients of the Air Medal
Chevaliers of the Légion d'honneur
1952 births
Recipients of the Defense Superior Service Medal
Recipients of the Humanitarian Service Medal